Evgeni Babsky (1902–1973) was a Soviet physiologist, D.Sc., Member of the Ukrainian Academy of Sciences.

Biography 
Evgeni Babsky was graduated from Moscow State University in 1924. During the period of 1932—1949 he works as professor at Moscow State V. I. Lenin Pedagogical Institute. In the 1950s he became head of the Laboratory of Clinical Physiology in the Institute of Physiology of the USSR Academy of Medical Sciences. He had contributed much to the study of mediators and the physiology of the heart, and developed a number of physiological methods of studying the human organism. Evgeni Babsky had published over 300 scientific works, including a number of monographs. His textbooks were reprinted many times in Russian and translated into other languages.

Evgeni Babsky died at the age of 71 on September 10, 1973, in Moscow.

Works

References

External links 

People from Goris
Moscow State University alumni
Academic staff of Moscow State Pedagogical University
1902 births
1973 deaths
Soviet physiologists
20th-century Russian scientists
I.M. Sechenov First Moscow State Medical University alumni